"Promised You" is the 33rd single by Zard, released November 15, 2000 under the B-Gram Records label. The single opened at #6 the first week. It charted for five weeks and sold over 115,000 copies.

Track list
All songs are written by Izumi Sakai.
promised you
composer: Seiichiro Kuribayashi/arrangement: Cybersound
for first time after two years, Seiichiro Kuribayashi came back to position of arranger of ZARD songs
Michael Africk participated in chorus part
the song was used in TV Asahi program Saturday Night at the Mysteries as theme song 
The Only Truth I Know is You
composer and arrangement: Akihito Tokunaga
Promised You (original karaoke)

References

2000 singles
Zard songs
Songs written by Izumi Sakai
2000 songs
Songs written by Seiichiro Kuribayashi
Songs with music by Akihito Tokunaga